Bussy may refer to:

People
Bussy (surname), a surname (including a list of people with the name)
Bussy Mansell (1623–1699), Welsh politician
Bussy Mansel, 4th Baron Mansel (died 1750), Welsh peer
Charles Joseph Patissier, Marquis de Bussy-Castelnau (1718–1785), French colonial governor

Places

France
Bussy, Cher, a commune in the Cher département 
Bussy, Oise, a commune in the Oise département 
Bussy-Albieux, a commune in the Loire département
Bussy-en-Othe, a commune in the Yonne département
Bussy-la-Pesle, Côte-d'Or, a commune in the Côte-d'Or département 
Bussy-la-Pesle, Nièvre, a commune in the Nièvre département 
Bussy-le-Château, a commune in the Marne département 
Bussy-le-Grand, a commune in the Côte-d'Or département 
Bussy-le-Repos, Marne, a commune in the Marne département
Bussy-le-Repos, Yonne, a commune in the Yonne département
Bussy-lès-Daours, a commune in the Somme département
Bussy-lès-Poix, a commune in the Somme département
Bussy-Lettrée, a commune in the Marne département
Bussy-Saint-Martin, a commune in the Seine-et-Marne département
Gigny-Bussy, a commune in the Marne département
Saint-Remy-sur-Bussy, a commune in the Marne département
Bussy-Saint-Georges, a commune in the Seine-et-Marne département

Switzerland
Bussy, Fribourg, a commune in the canton of Fribourg
Bussy-Chardonney, a commune in the canton of Vaud
Bussy-sur-Morges, a village and former municipality in the canton of Vaud
Bussy-sur-Moudon, a commune in the canton of Vaud

Other
Bussy D'Ambois, a Jacobean play by George Chapman, opened in London in 1603
Bussy, a portmanteau of "boy" and "-ussy" (derived from "pussy") used to denote the male anus

See also
 Busy (disambiguation)